The Biggest Loser: Glory Days is the sixteenth season of The Biggest Loser which premiered on September 11, 2014 on NBC. Bob Harper and Dolvett Quince returned as trainers, while Jillian Michaels decided to leave the show. There are two new trainers this season: Jessie Pavelka and Jennifer Widerstrom. This season, the contestants are all former athletes including former National Football League players and Olympic Gold medalists. The contestants competed to win a $250,000 prize which was awarded to Toma Dobrosavljevic, the contestant with the highest percentage of weight loss.

This season was also the last to be hosted by Alison Sweeney, who left to focus on other projects.

Comeback Canyon
Dolvett and the two new trainers are with the main contestants at the Biggest Loser Ranch. A new twist this season is that eliminated contestants leave the ranch and meet Bob Harper at "Comeback Canyon", a secret training ground. Every week he trains two people there, with the one with the lowest percentage of weight loss leaving the show for good. There are no challenges to win immunity or bonus pounds; it is just about true weight loss. The winning contestant is then joined by the next eliminated contestant from the main ranch for the next week. The person winning the last Comeback Canyon weigh-in will be sent back to the Ranch for the semi-finals and will still have the chance to become the next Biggest Loser.

Jackie in week nine was the first person to win a second weigh-in at Comeback Canyon. Damien in week eleven was the second person to win a second weigh-in at Comeback Canyon. Scott in week thirteen was the third person to win a second weigh-in at Comeback Canyon and in week fourteen was the first person to win a third weigh-in at Comeback Canyon. Woody in week 15 won the final Comeback Canyon weigh-in and returned to the ranch.

Contestants

The "Total Votes" column indicates the number of votes cast against the contestant when he/she was eliminated.
 This contestant quit the competition.
 This contestant fell below the Red Line, and was eliminated without any votes.
 This contestant lost a weigh-in and was eliminated without any votes, due to having the lower percentage of weight loss on a team with just two remaining contestants.
 This contestant was eliminated due to losing an Elimination Challenge.

Weigh-Ins
Contestants are listed in reverse chronological order of elimination.

 In Week 6, Sonya was The Biggest Loser on the ranch, but Matt had the highest percentage of weight loss overall at Comeback Canyon.
 In Week 11, Jordan was The Biggest Loser on the ranch, but Damien had the highest percentage of weight loss overall at Comeback Canyon.
 In Week 14, Toma was The Biggest Loser on the ranch, but Scott had the highest percentage of weight loss overall at Comeback Canyon.
 In Week 15, Sonya was The Biggest Loser on the ranch, but Woody had the highest percentage of weight loss overall at Comeback Canyon.
 Woody Carter originally wore an aqua colored shirt during Singles until he was eliminated in Week 14. When he returned as the Comeback contestant, he was wearing black.

Teams
 Jessie's Team
 Jen's Team
 Dolvett's Team
 Bob's Original players

Standings
 Week's Biggest Loser (Team or Individuals)
 Week's Biggest Loser and Immunity
 Week's Biggest Loser and at Comeback Canyon
 Week's Biggest Loser on Ranch in the event that the biggest loser is currently at Comeback Canyon
 Immunity (Challenge or Weigh-in)
 Results from At-Home or Comeback Canyon Players
 Contestant Withdraws before Weigh-In

BMI
 Underweight (less than 18.5 BMI)
 Normal (18.5 – 24.9 BMI)
 Overweight (25 – 29.9 BMI)
 Obese Class I (30 – 34.9 BMI)
 Obese Class II (35 – 39.9 BMI)
 Obese Class III (greater than 40 BMI)

Winners
 $250,000 Winner (among the finalists)
 $100,000 Winner (among the eliminated contestants)

Weigh-in difference history

Toma's 12 pound weight loss in week 12 was displayed as -11 due to the weight he gained last week.
Lori's 3 pound weight loss in week 14 was displayed as -4 due to her 1-pound advantage from the challenge.
Toma's 14 pound weight loss in week 16 was displayed as -15 due to his 1-pound advantage from the challenge.
Toma's 3 pound weight loss in week 17 was displayed as -4 due to his 1-pound advantage from the challenge.

Weigh-in percentages history

Toma's 4.86% in week 12 was displayed as 4.47% due to the weight he gained the previous week.
Lori's 1.30% in week 14 was displayed as 1.74% due to her 1-pound advantage from the challenge.
Toma's 6.48% in week 16 was displayed as 6.94% due to his 1-pound advantage from the challenge.
Toma's 1.49% in week 17 was displayed as 1.98% due to his 1-pound advantage from the challenge.

Weekly summary

Week 1: "Opening Day"
First aired September 11, 2014
Twenty former athletes come to the ranch looking for a second chance to regain their "glory days". The cast includes Scott Mitchell, a former NFL quarterback, Damien Woody, a two-time Super Bowl champion, Lori Harrigan-Mack, a three-time Olympic gold medalist, Zina Garrison, a tennis legend, Rob Guiry, a college rugby player who once weighed 501 pounds before coming to the Biggest loser, Mike Murburg, who his son died fighting in the Marine Corps, Matthew Miller, who once had six-pack abs, and Woody Carter, whose wife died of cancer and promises to lose the weight for her. The contestants arrive at the Los Angeles Memorial Coliseum, where they are shocked to find they will be working with two new trainers, Jessie Pavelka and Jennifer Widerstrom, as well as veteran trainer Dolvett Quince. The first weigh-in is emotional for a number of the contestants, but it reminds them of why they have embarked upon this journey - to get healthy for themselves and their families. This week's theme is Opening Day, and not only do the trainers have the opportunity to assess the contestants, but the contestants get to see what the new trainers are all about. At the first workout, the trainers work out the contestants at different stations, tapping into their inner athletes and seeing what they're made of. It's a humbling experience for the contestants, as for many of them, the last time they hit the gym, they were at the top of their game. JJ, a former college football star, seems to struggle the most, and collapses on the treadmill, unable to continue his workout.

At the first challenge, both the contestants and the trainers are put to the test. The contestants must compete in a volleyball-inspired obstacle course while pushing a giant ball up a steep sand dune. At the finish line, each trainer has a volleyball court with spots for six balls each. When the contestants reach the finish line, they must roll their ball into the court of the trainer with whom they want to work, dividing into three teams of six. The two people who finish last will be eliminated and forced to leave the ranch. Former NFL star Scott quickly takes the lead, flying up the dune to join Dolvett's Red Team. Rondalee finishes second and chooses Jen's White Team, followed by Lori, who becomes the first member of Jessie's Blue Team. While the teams are filling up fast, it's an uphill battle for the last three contestants. Chandra is in last place, but she gets a second chance when Vanessa is sidelined by a pulled leg muscle. Meanwhile, former tennis champ Zina struggles with the last few feet and collapses just steps away from the finish line. This drives Chandra to dig deep, and with the support of her castmates, she makes it up the hill to take the last spot on the Blue Team, thus eliminating Zina and Vanessa from the ranch. But it's not over yet for these two! In a surprise twist, veteran trainer Bob Harper ambushes the women on their ride to the airport, announcing that their journey isn't over yet. He brings the ladies to Comeback Canyon, a place of redemption, where they will continue their training. At the end of each week, a weigh-in will determine who gets to stay another week, and who goes home for good. Eventually, Bob will return to the ranch with his comeback contestant, who still has a chance to be a finalist.

Back at the ranch, it's time for the Last-Chance Workout, where former NFLer Damien nearly reaches his breaking point when Jessie has him push over 500 pounds on a sled across the room. But this Super Bowl champion has a lot more fight left in him, and he finishes strong. At the first ever Comeback Canyon weigh-in, it's the WNBA vs. Wimbledon, as Vanessa, the former WNBA center, takes on Zina, the former tennis Olympian. When they step on the scale, Vanessa's 14-pound weight loss trumps Zina's eight, and Zina is sent home for good.

At the ranch weigh-in, the trainers agree that the former athletes have truly raised the bar this season, working out at a whole other level than past contestants. The White Team is up first and makes Jen proud, losing a solid 104 pounds, 5.01% of their combined weight with Sonya's 23 lb weight-loss, aside from Patti from season 9, who lost the most weight for a woman, Matt also losing 23 lbs., and Toma's 20 lb. weight-loss. The Red Team needs to lose more than 104 lbs. Even though after Emmy lost 6 lbs., the rest of the players put up great number's, with Jordan losing 22 lbs., Scott's 23 lb. weight-loss, and Rob's amazing 33 lb. weight-loss. Mike is the final red team member left and needs to lose 5 lbs. The Red Team is concerned, as their team member Mike has been limited to exercising in the pool after injuring his knee earlier in the week. But the former football and wrestling star proves he's in it to win by losing a whopping 38 pounds, leading his team to a victorious 138-pound weight loss (6.63%). The Blue Team needs to lose more than 90 lbs. to beat the White Team. Even though Gina and Andrea both lost 14 lbs., it wasn't enough to keep the Blue Team safe because of Damien, Jackie, Lori, and Chandra put up low numbers. That means the Blue Team, who loses a meager 59 pounds (3.27%), must eliminate one of its own. While Damien and Chandra each get votes, it's Andrea who is sent to Comeback Canyon to take on Vanessa next week. After being eliminated the first week, Zina now weighs 223 pounds and plans to continue her success off the court and lose 100 pounds.

Week 2: "The Knockout"
First aired September 18, 2014
It's Week 2 at the ranch and this week is all about knocking out the competition, excuses and the core emotional issues that have led the contestants to this point. Jessie, Jen and Dolvett aren't just reshaping their teams' bodies; they're reshaping the way the contestants see themselves and deal with their personal issues. Jessie starts off by focusing on proper nutrition, which is a vital component to weight loss. He teaches the Blue Team how to make a Waldorf salad, and over their healthy meal, bonds with the contestants by opening up about missing his wife and young son back in Toronto.

Meanwhile, the White Team pushes themselves to the limit, but Jen is worried about Matt, who lacks his teammates' level of motivation. She sits him down to get to the bottom of why he keeps making excuses, and learns he is afraid that if he doesn't make lifestyle changes, he'll lose his longtime girlfriend. On the other side of the gym, Blake can't catch her breath and starts having an anxiety attack. Dolvett sees her struggling and tries to get her to open up, but she refuses to reveal her demons on camera. Hiding behind her infectious smile, Blake laughs off his concern. Frustrated, Dolvett explains that if she doesn't talk through her problems, she'll never keep the weight off. He then kicks her out of the gym, saying, "If you're not willing to let me in, I can't train you." The confrontation makes Dolvett realize that if he expects his team to confide in him, he has to open up to them as well. He told his Red Team about how he once opened up to John Rhode (the winner of The Biggest Loser: Battle of the Ages) about how Dolvett found out he was adopted and abused during his Childhood, he opened up to see if Blake will open up to him. After he divulges how he was raised in an abusive family and never felt good enough, Blake feels safe enough to tell him her story.

This week's challenge focuses on overcoming the excuses that led to the contestants' weight gain. The teams must knock down four walls labeled "food," "work," "responsibilities" and "fear," and carry a punching bag through an obstacle course to win. The winning team is guaranteed use of the gym that week, while the losing teams may be out of luck. It's a close race between the White Team and the Red Team, but in the end, the White Team pulls off the victory. The White Team must then decide which team to knock out of the gym, Rondolee wanted the Blue Team to be kicked out of the gym and train with the Red Team, but Sonya, Matt, JJ, Woody, and Toma choose the Red Team to be kicked out of the gym, because they see them as their biggest competition, and the reason they chose the Blue Team, was to use it as motivation to work harder and prove they're there to win.

Without use of the gym, the Red Team must work even harder to lose weight this week. Dolvett gets creative, putting them through their toughest session yet by having them move furniture around in the house and take them to a track and field course. The contestants also meet with Dr. H this week to discuss their current health reports. Scott and Rob from the Red Team talked to Dr. H, Lori from the Blue Team talked to him, but no one from the White Team was shown with Dr. H. He shows them computer-generated images of what they will look like if they continue gaining or losing weight. The forecasts are upsetting, but Rob takes it the hardest when Dr. H brings over the wheelchair Rob will be confined to if he doesn't make serious lifestyle changes. Rob explodes and storms out of the office in a rage, screaming that he already knows he'll be dead in five years if he doesn't shape up.

At the Last Chance Workout, Rob breaks down again, frustrated that he can't complete the workout. "I just want to look in the mirror and not hate myself," he sobs to Dolvett. But Dolvett assures Rob he's not alone, and the team finishes their workout feeling proud of themselves for all their hard work - even without a gym.

Over at Comeback Canyon, it's time for the second weigh-in. This time it's Vanessa the former WNBA center taking on Andrea, the high school cheerleader. Andrea sees herself as small compared to Vanessa's Goliath, and perhaps she is, considering she defeats Vanessa by losing six pounds, with a percentage of 2.61% of her body weight. While Vanessa loses a solid five pounds, with a percentage of 1.42% weight loss, that wasn't enough to keep her at Comeback Canyon for another week. So Vanessa is the second contestant to be eliminated.

Back at the ranch, it's time to see who will face off against Andrea next week. The Red Team is up first and has lost a collective 52 pounds (2.67%). Despite a rough week, Rob managed to lose 12 pounds, but doesn't see it as a victory. Dolvett does, however, and announces he'll celebrate for the both of them. The White Team is up next, and beats the Red Team by losing 57 pounds, 2.89% of their total body weight. But in the second underdog victory of the day, the Blue Team comes out on top by losing 44 pounds (2.90%). Jessie and his team are overjoyed that they proved the White Team wrong, and are relieved to not have to face elimination two weeks in a row. The Red Team is sent to the elimination room, where they choose to send home Emmy, based on the fact that she lost the lowest percentage of weight this week. Emmy is sent packing but is in for a surprise when she meets Bob and learns her journey is not over yet. After being at Comeback Canyon for 2 weeks, Vanessa now weighs 321 lbs. and plans on wearing her dream wedding dress at her wedding.

Week 3: "Double Header"
First aired September 25, 2014
Week 3 proves to be the most challenging yet, as it's both a double-header week and homesickness has started to set in. To keep the contestants motivated, the trainers have a special surprise: The Biggest Loser Wall of Glory, full of inspirational photos of the former athletes at the height of their game. But while the pictures cause some to get emotional, the wall isn't about dwelling on the past; it's about making the contestants' glory days a thing of the future. Looking back at images of themselves in their prime motivates the contestants to get back to the state of mind needed to achieve greatness. During the workout, Lori admits to Jessie that this experience has been overwhelmingly emotional for her. She misses her husband and son and is having a hard time staying focused on why she's here. Jessie tries to draw out her inner champion, but she's still just going through the motions. Can Lori make a breakthrough and get her head in the game?

Now for the double header! The contestants must face off in two challenges this week, both of which have a big impact on how the rest of the game unfolds. The first is a nutrition quiz, in which each team gets five minutes in the nutrition room to memorize as much as they can about the healthy and unhealthy foods stocked there. Alison Sweeney then tests the contestants on their knowledge with questions about the nutritional value of seven items. If a player gets the answer right, their team gets a point. If they get the answer wrong, their trainer has to eat that round's junk food. The team with the most points at the end of seven rounds not only wins the competition, they also get a two-pound advantage at the next weigh-in. The trainers are none too pleased at the prospect of gorging themselves on fattening treats, and vow to get revenge on their teams in their next workout. During the competition, Jessie and Dolvett are forced to share a slice of pecan pie, and vegetarian egg rolls. Then, Dolvett and Jen have to eat a bacon double cheeseburger with a 20 oz. glass of soda. Jessie also has to eat an egg, cheese and spinach scramble. While all three teams put up a good fight, the White Team wins their second challenge in a row and gains the coveted two-pound advantage. After the challenge, Jen shows her team how to make a healthy version of one of their favorite foods: baked ziti. Her trick is to use less pasta and pile on the veggies and meat.

Part two of the double header is a spinner bike challenge, in which each team must pedal uphill 24.8 miles, the same distance as the biking portion of an Olympic triathlon. The challenge is tough, but it's worth the reward, as the winning team gets a four-pound advantage on the scale. The Red Team takes an early lead, but soon falls behind the Blue Team. Suddenly, the White Team comes from behind and wins their third challenge in a row! Now Jen's team is the team to beat with a six-pound advantage over the others. But the winners have a difficult choice: If they keep their four pounds, the Red and Blue Teams get letters from home. If they give up the four pounds, they get to read letters from home. The White Team chooses to keep their weight advantage, and the other teams are overjoyed to get some much-needed emotional support from friends and family. Tears are shed, but the letters really help motivate the contestants and give them strength. This is especially true for Lori, who has a breakthrough and gets her spark back.

Meanwhile, Scott teaches the Red Team how to play football. As a former NFL quarterback, he knows how to bring a team together and make them stronger. His teammates are appreciative of his leadership skills, and they're truly growing into a family. While everything seems to be going swimmingly for the White Team, Sonya admits that her struggle with self-doubt has had a crippling effect on her personal life. She has never been in a relationship because she is ashamed of the way she looks and can't imagine someone else finding her attractive. She reveals that as of October, she will be a real-life 40-year-old virgin, and is desperate to overcome the insecurities that are holding her back.

At Comeback Canyon, it's time for Emmy and Andrea to weigh in to see who will stay another week with Bob. Andrea is the first to step on the scale and, hoping to defend her title, posts a four-pound weight loss. Emmy, who needs five pounds or more to stay, loses an impressive six pounds, sending Andrea home for good.

The ranch weigh-in is next, and everyone is curious to see how the White Team's six-pound advantage plays out. The White Team is up first, and while Matt drops seven pounds, everyone is shocked when contestant after contestant posts incredibly low numbers - mostly threes and fours. Even with their six extra pounds, the team's total weight loss is only 33 pounds, or 1.72% of their total weight.
After the White Team's poor performance, the Red Team steps on the scale, confident they can lose the necessary 28 pounds to beat them. Despite some low numbers, the team pulls through due to Mike's nine-pound weight loss and Scott's impressive 11-pound loss. The Red Team's total loss is 32 pounds, or 1.95%. The Blue Team is up last, and to beat the White team, they need to lose at least 25 pounds, a little over five pounds per person. But after Damien's nine-pound loss, they put up even lower numbers than the White Team, including two ones and a two. Their grand total is a meager 16 pounds (1.09%), and they are sent to the elimination room for the second time, where Chandra is voted out. In the end, the White Team's advantage has no effect on the weigh-in at all. It also appears that the Week 2 curse is a thing of the past, and Week 3 is the problem week for these former athletes. Can the contestants get back on track for Week 4?  Andrea is back at home and now weighs 184 lbs. She plans on working out with her husband and he had lost 50 lbs. Andrea hopes that she loses enough weight to win the at-home prize.

Week 4: "The Lottery"
First aired October 2, 2014
NOTE: This episode marks the return of the one-hour format.
Week 4 is all about the luck of the draw, as the contestants must face the Biggest Loser Lottery. Every contestant has a Ping-Pong ball with their name on it in a lottery machine. Alison draws the balls out one by one until there is one left, and that contestant will be sent home for a week, with his or her trainer. At first, many contestants voice their interest in going home... until they learn that only the chosen person's weight will count for their entire team that week.

After much suspense, Damien is chosen to go home, where he will have to face the temptations and challenges of the real world. Luckily, he'll have Jessie by his side, and the Blue Team is used to being the underdogs at this point. Damien is pumped for the challenge, referring to the upcoming week as a "business trip." After all, as Dolvett says, "Damien is a two-time Super Bowl Champion. You really think he's going to go home and lose focus?" So Damien and Jessie head to Mendham, New Jersey, where Damien's wife and seven kids have prepared a welcoming party. Damien and his wife are high school sweethearts, and it's obvious how much strength Damien derives from being around his family. The former NFLer shows Jessie a photo of his mother, who died two years ago. Damien admits he regrets not being able to say "I love you" one last time, and has been wracked with guilt ever since. In fact, that was when he started to pack on the pounds, and he ended up at the ranch because he wasn't willing to let go and forgive himself. Now he's learning it's okay to express his feelings and he doesn't have to stay strong for everything else.

Back at the ranch, the rest of the Blue Team is struggling to keep up their rigorous workout routine without their trainer. While they're at a serious disadvantage, they still have to be accountable for their weight loss, because if they are sent to the elimination room, one of them still has to go home. Dolvett and the Red Team are pushing themselves harder than ever as well, and Mike has had a real breakthrough. Yesterday would have been his son's 27th birthday, and while it's difficult for Mike to handle his son's untimely death in combat, he's finally getting past the grieving. He has a whole new mental state and is grateful to be leaving his baggage behind and getting healthy. The White Team is also pushing themselves to the limit because they know with their winning streak, the target is planted firmly on their back. They're the only team that is still six members strong, and while Jen feels unbeatable, she's afraid her team will start getting complacent because of their winning streak.

Over at Comeback Canyon, it's time for Emmy and Chandra to face off on the scale. Emmy is up first and loses four pounds, or 1.65% weight loss. Chandra is still stinging from her meager one-pound weight loss last week, and knows she has to step it up to stay in the game. She needs to post at least six pounds to stay... and is shocked to see she's dropped seven! With her 2.16% weight loss, Chandra is safe for another week with Bob at Comeback Canyon.

At the ranch weigh-in, the Red Team is up first and loses a collective 47 pounds, or 2.92% of their body weight. The White Team goes second, and needs to lose more than 55 pounds, an average of nine pounds apiece, in order to guarantee their safety. In an impressive showing, Jen's team loses a whopping 62 pounds, or 3.29%. Now it's all up to Damien to determine whether the Blue Team is safe this week. The girls put up pretty low numbers, but Damien's weight is the only one that counts. He steps on the scale and loses an incredible 14 pounds! Jessie and the rest of the team are overjoyed that Damien managed to lose 3.91% of his body weight, despite the distractions and temptations of home. Unfortunately for the Red Team, Damien's triumph means one of them has to go home. Blake has the highest percentage of weight loss, so she is safe. And, as it turns out, so is the rest of the team, because Mike volunteers himself for elimination. He sees the team as his kids, and feels, as a father, he has done his job. The Red Team bids a tearful goodbye to their beloved member, grateful for his sacrifice. Luckily, it's not over yet for Mike, as he now heads to Comeback Canyon to take on Chandra. Now weighing at 210 lbs. Emmy and her family plan on getting active by doing 5k runs per month and plans on running a half marathon by the finale.

Week 5: "Sidelined"
First aired October 9, 2014
After five weeks of hard work, it's time to throw these former athletes a curve ball and make the game a little more complicated.

But first, the pressure is on the White Team, who is undefeated in challenges and has never lost a member. But Jen isn't sitting back and getting comfortable. She's concerned because Matt is slacking, so she checks in with him to see what's going on. He tells her about being a hometown star as a young athlete and model. He had everything going for him, but when he got injured, the doctors said if he continued to play sports, he'd be paralyzed on the right side of his body. Devastated, Matt turned towards food for comfort. He gained a lot of weight, to the point where people in his hometown asked his girlfriend if she got a new boyfriend. All of this baggage has been weighing on him, and is the reason he came to the ranch to change his life. Over at Comeback Canyon, Mike has no regrets about sacrificing himself for his team, but his job isn't finished yet. Both he and Chandra are making progress and proving to themselves how strong they are and how far they've come. Mike's focus was initially on the death of his son, and with his hard work, he's turned his attention to himself and his life. At the Ranch, it's time for this week's high-flying challenge. The contestants have to pull their body weight across a canyon while suspended nearly 100 feet in the air - the height of a ten-story building. Woody is NOT having it - he's terrified of heights and is excited to sit out because the White Team has extra players. When Ali points out that he sat out the last challenge, and therefore must compete in this one, the devastated look on Woody's face is heartrending.

This challenge has a lot at stake. Whoever wins gets to choose one player from any team to sideline at the next weigh-in, meaning their weight will not count towards their team's total. This could finally be the week that the White Team gets taken down a peg! In addition, the Red Line is now in play, which means that the member of the losing team with the lowest weight-loss percentage will automatically be sent home. Surprise, surprise, after the first round, the White Team is in the lead. Damien gives an extra push to catch up to them and suddenly hears a pop! His shoulder is injured but he pushes through the pain, unwilling to let his team down. By the final round, the White Team is still ahead, but then Woody is up... and he is petrified. While Woody is pushing himself, Lori comes from behind, making the zip line look easy. She passes the Red Team's Rob and is almost there, but Woody finally makes it across, bringing home a victory for the White Team once again.

At the Last Chance Workout, the Red and Blue Teams strategize and prepare for one of their team members to be sidelined at the weigh-in. The Blue Team assumes that Damien will be chosen and it will be up to the three ladies to pull their weight for the team. They're up for the challenge and are excited to have Damien's back the way he had theirs the week before. Meanwhile, Jen takes the White Team to the beach for their last workout and a strategy session.

At the Comeback Canyon weigh-in, Mike faces off against Chandra to see who will stay with Bob another week. Mike steps on the scale first, posting a seven-pound weight loss, 2.10% of his body weight. After five weeks, Mike has lost an incredible 73 pounds! Chandra needs at least seven pounds to stay in the game, but comes up short with four pounds. She takes it in stride, though, and walks out with her head held high. "I've learned how to have faith in myself and be confident in myself," she says, tearing up.

Back at the ranch, it's time for the Week 5 weigh-in - and the dreaded Red Line. The White Team says they were considering three people to sideline: Damien, Scott and Blake. In the end, they choose Damien... did they make the right choice? The Red Team is up, and Scott steps on the scale first, posting a massive 13-pound weight loss. The Red Team is as elated as the White Team is devastated - they regret not picking Scott. Blake is up next and loses seven pounds, followed by Rob with five, and Jordan with seven. The Red Team's total is 32 pounds, or 2.6%. The Blue Team weighs in next, and it's up to the ladies to keep the team above water. Gina loses an impressive seven pounds, followed by Lori who loses a whopping nine. Jackie rounds it out with another eight pounds, meaning the Blue Team's total is 24 pounds, or 3.16%! Even though his weight doesn't count towards their total, Damien steps on the scale and loses a mere six pounds, meaning the White Team's plan backfired. With the sideline twist having no effect on the weigh-in, the White Team is on their own to make sure they stay six members strong. JJ posts five pounds, followed by Sonya with six, Woody with seven, and Rondalee with eight. Toma loses nine pounds, but when Matt gets on the scale, he puts up just three pounds, bringing the White Team's total to 38 pounds, or 2.08%. This means they have lost the weigh-in and that Matt, with the lowest weight loss percentage, is automatically going home. The kicker is that if the team had chosen to sideline Scott, they would have won by 0.01%. And that would mean that Rob would have been automatically eliminated because he has the lowest percentage. Luckily for Matt, he is headed to Comeback Canyon, where he will take on Mike next week. Chandra's now weighs 287 lbs. and made her especially her grandpa. Chandra plans on losing 150 lbs.

Week 6: "The Tailgate"
First aired October 16, 2014
Week 6 starts off with a test of the mind, body and taste buds, which can only mean one thing... it's time for this season's first temptation challenge! Alison welcomes everyone to a tailgate party, where each player will have three minutes in a tent filled with typical tailgating foods - the last thing the contestants should be putting in their bodies. Without knowing how the other players choose, the contestants must decide whether or not they will eat, and whoever eats the most calories wins immunity at the next weigh-in. It's the biggest risk and the biggest reward thus far. However, the winning player's weight will still count towards their team's total, and if they gain weight this week, they will lose immunity. Also, the Red Line is once again in play this week. Woody is up first, and despite some initial hesitation, eats 378 calories worth of meatballs. Scott has a few meatballs, for a total of 270 calories, but has a hard time getting them down. JJ is overwhelmed by temptation, but remembers how terrible he felt on Day 1 and never wants to feel that way again. Blake also refuses to eat, as does Rondalee, who actually drops to the ground and does burpees for three minutes instead. Sonya, Lori, Gina, Damien and Jordan also resist temptation, while Rob decides to go for it and eats 602 calories, taking the lead. Toma is the last to enter the tent, and while he manages to eat a whopping 852 calories, his body can barely take it after eating so cleanly for five weeks. In the end, it was worth the stomachache, as Toma wins immunity for the week!

At the gym, Jen pushes Toma especially hard, and he promises his team he will not let them down, despite his immunity. On the Red Team, Dolvett is worried about Rob falling back into his old habits after only losing five pounds last week and choosing to eat at the temptation challenge. But Rob assures him he's never felt so good and finally loves himself - he will never return to the old Rob. Dolvett is also concerned about Scott. While the NFL quarterback has been a powerful leader for his team, Dolvett thinks there are deeper issues he needs to resolve. Scott opens up about the lack of love in his childhood and how, no matter what successes came his way, he could never find a home. Dolvett commends him for letting go of the pain and anger he's been holding in his whole life. Scott thanks him, adding, "I don't want to die while I'm still alive." Over on the Blue Team, Jessie is concerned about Jackie, whom he describes as "switched off," due to missing her kids. Jackie reminds herself that her kids have never seen her happy, and Jessie adds that being at home doesn't mean as much as being away now so she can return the best mother she can be. Jackie realizes she's fighting for her life, her happiness and herself - and she wants to win!

At Comeback Canyon, Bob sits down with Mike, who has written a beautiful poem about his experience thus far. It's called The Lesser Man, and discusses his struggle with weight, grief and fear in general. Mike and Matt have done a great job motivating each other this week, and both men have really impressed Bob. Unfortunately, only one can stay at Comeback Canyon... Mike steps on the scale first and posts an incredible 11-pound loss, 3.37% of his body weight. Matt knows he has to lose at least 12 pounds to defeat Mike, which he does by dropping a shocking 16 pounds! And with that, Mike must say goodbye and head home for good.

At the ranch, it's time to see if Toma's tailgate temptation backfires on the White Team. JJ gets on the scale first and loses seven pounds, bringing him to 335 pounds. He's elated, as the last time he was that weight, he was a Division 1 football star. Sonya is up next and also loses seven pounds, followed by Rondalee who loses six, and Woody who loses eight. Toma is up last and wants to prove to his team he's a man of his word and worked his hardest this week. He posts a solid seven pounds and is very proud of himself. The White Team's total is 35 pounds, 2.41%. The Blue Team is up next, and they need to lose more than 25 pounds to stay safe. Jackie drops five pounds, followed by Lori, who loses four. Gina only posts three pounds, leaving Damien to make up the slack for his team. He needs to lose 13 pounds, but only loses seven and is upset with himself for being unable to come through at a clutch moment. The Blue Team's total weight loss is 19 pounds, 1.77%. The Red Team now needs to lose more than 21 pounds to stay in the game and send the Blue Team to elimination. Scott posts seven pounds, followed by Jordan, who loses six, and Blake, who loses five. Rob is up last and needs to lose more than three pounds. He's very concerned after his poor performance last week, but he manages to drop an impressive 11 pounds! Crying, he expresses how grateful he is to still be here and that he's finally learning to love himself. The Red Team's total is 29 pounds, 2.42%, meaning they have won this week's weigh-in. Unfortunately for the Blue Team, that means they must send one of their own home. This week it's Gina, whose 1.43% weight loss landed her below the red line. We'll see how she matches up against Matt at next week's Comeback Canyon weigh-in. Mike is back at home now weighing 279 lbs. and visits his son's grave and thanking him for being on the ranch and is now not a Type II diabetic. He plans on walking 9 miles and swimming 4 miles every day and weighing at 250 lbs. by the finale.

Week 7: "The Drop"
First aired October 23, 2014
The contestants have been competing as teams for nearly two months, and nobody wants to let their team down. This week, however, is all about not letting the trainers down.

Jessie takes Lori out onto the softball field to tap into her inner athlete and why she's at the ranch. Lori was the first woman in Olympic history to throw a no-hitter and played in three Olympics, but hasn't set foot on a field in ten years. Lori puts on her USA jersey, steps out onto the mound, and pitches another no-hitter against Jessie. It feels amazing to still be able to throw the ball hard, and she doesn't think she could have done that seven weeks ago.

At the Challenge, Dolvett, Jessie and Jen sit on diving boards high above a pool. Three members from each team must hold up 15% of their combined weight in order to keep their trainers from falling in. If the entire team lets go of the rope, the weight hits a target and the trainer falls into the water. The first team to drop their trainer loses him or her for the whole week. The second team to drop their trainer only gets to see them for the Last Chance Workout. The White Team sits out Sonya and Woody, which means Toma, Rondalee and JJ are competing and must hold up 126 pounds. The Red Team sits out Blake, meaning Rob, Scott and Jordan will hold up 145 pounds. The Blue Team only has three players, so Damien, Jackie and Lori are all competing, and have to hold up 127 pounds. Scott is the first to drop after 34 minutes, followed by Jordan. This leaves the Red Team's fate in Rob's hands. Unfortunately, Rob can't hold on anymore and Dolvett drops. Rob freaks out - he thinks without Dolvett this week, he'll be the one going home. JJ and Toma drop next, leaving just Rondalee for the White Team. But she can't hold on any longer and drops, which means the Blue Team wins! Not one of their members let go of their rope, and they finally take down the undefeated White Team.

Scott feels like he let the Red Team down by being the first to fall, but without Dolvett this week, he is determined to lead his team to victory by example. The White Team is worried about only having Jen for one day and don't want to let her down. Over at Comeback Canyon, Bob has created an obstacle course to challenge Matt and Gina. The course is a team effort, which means Matt can't just do everything on his own and must learn to work with a partner. Gina is working on not being anxious and afraid, and Bob wants her to be confronted by scary exercises to prove to herself how strong she is. Both model and mom step up and impress Bob with their hard work and collaboration. Unfortunately, only one can stay. Bob talks about the two contenders, saying Matt lost 16 pounds last week, so he could be at a disadvantage, while Gina lost so little the past two weeks, she may have an advantage. Gina is up first and loses a mere three pounds. Matt needs to lose five or more pounds to keep his comeback alive. Matt steps on the scale and only loses two pounds, meaning Gina is safe for another week! Matt walks out with his head held high and considers this experience a blessing. He vows that the next time America sees him, he will have his six-pack abs back. At Last Chance Workout, Jen returns to whip the White Team into shape before weigh-in. She calls it the Only Chance Workout, and pushes them harder than ever. Jessie has the Blue Team work with punching bags that weigh the amount they have each lost since coming to the ranch. The players cannot believe they used to carry around all that weight and feel incredible about their progress thus far.

At the weigh-in, it's time to see whether the Blue Team can sweep Week 7, or whether the other teams can prove they can do it on their own. The Red Line is also in play again this week, meaning the player on the losing team with the lowest percentage of weight loss will automatically be sent home. The Red Team is up first, and it's time to find out how they did without Dolvett. Rob steps on the scale and loses nine pounds. At 396 pounds, he's excited to say goodbye to the 400s and can't believe he weighed 501 when he first looked at the Biggest Loser website. Jordan and Scott both lose seven pounds, followed by Blake who loses five, and also falls into "one"derland. The Red Team's total is 28 pounds, or 2.39% of their combined weight. The Blue Team is up next and needs to lose more than 20 pounds. Lori is up first and loses five pounds, followed by Jackie who loses a mere two. Once again, it's all up to Damien, who must lose more than 13 pounds to keep his team safe. Damien steps on the scale and loses five, meaning the Blue Team lost a total of 12 pounds, 1.42%. Jessie is upset and thinks he needs to reevaluate how he's training his team. The White Team is up last, and must lose more than 20 pounds, despite only having Jen for one day. JJ drops a solid seven, while Toma and Woody only lose four. Rondalee is up next and posts just two pounds, which means Sonya has to lose at least four to save her team. Sonya steps on the scale… and loses six pounds! She is elated to have been able to pull through for her team. Their grand total is 23 pounds, 1.62%. This means that despite their challenge win, the Blue Team has lost and must face the Red Line. Sadly, it's Jackie's time to leave the ranch, as she only lost 0.79% of her body weight. She is at peace with that, and is so proud to go home to be a role model to her two girls. Now the Blue Team is down to two players... what will happen to them next week? Since Matt first started the show, he now weighs at 272 lbs. and married his girlfriend at Adam's Canyon. He plans on getting the six-pack abs by the finale and plan his wedding.

Week 8: "Penalty Box"
First aired October 30, 2014
It's Week 8, and in the past two months, the contestants have lost nearly 700 pounds! In this week's competition, each team chooses an MVP to go head-to-head running on a giant treadmill. When a player can no longer run, they fall into the pool. The last player running not only wins the challenge for their team, but also wins the opportunity to assign penalties to the two losing teams.

Rondalee steps up for the White Team, taking on two NFLers: Scott for the Red Team and Damien for the Blue Team. The Blue Team is down to only two players - Damien and Lori - so the stakes are especially high. The Red Team hasn't won a challenge all season and they are very sick of losing. Rondalee is the first to fall in, leaving the quarterback and the lineman to face off. It's a tough battle, but in the end Damien drops, which means Scott nabs the Red Team's first victory! Now it's time to assign the penalties. One team will be on cleaning duty - they have to clean the whole house and can't hit the gym until their chores are done. The other team will be leaving the ranch and won't be back until the weigh-in. They won't have their trainer or access to the gym. Instead, they'll be headed to the polar opposite of the ranch: Las Vegas. The Red Team decides to send the White Team to Vegas, seeing as they've been the dominant team all season. That means Damien and Lori are going to have to clean house all week.

Before the White Team heads to Sin City, Jen sits down with Vegas-native Woody. She's very concerned about him heading back to the city where he gained all his weight and lost his wife. It will be his first anniversary without his wife of 29 years. Woody is determined to stay on track and make the most of the trip.

The White Team arrives in Vegas and is sent to a lavish suite filled with chocolate covered strawberries and champagne. Woody knows firsthand that this is the city of temptation - it's a 24-hour town and it's hard to stay focused. So the team braves the hotel buffet, hoping to find low-calorie, low-sodium options. It's a struggle, but they're making it work. They even manage to find creative ways to exercise - swimming in the hotel pool and climbing the faux Eiffel Tower. The contestants are finally getting some real-world experience and are learning how to fend for themselves. While most of the team is staying on track, Rondalee and Sonya are worried about JJ. He wants to "sin and win," meaning party it up in Vegas while still winning at the weigh-in. Can he pull it off? Back at the ranch, the Blue Team is stuck on cleaning duty, and the house is a complete pigsty. Jessie is frustrated and pitches in with the cleaning in order to get them into the gym faster. Of course, the Red Team is living it up with the gym to themselves! Dolvett couldn't be happier, but wants to continue working with Blake on her self-worth. She misses her friends and family and is having a hard time being alone. Dovlett wants her to realize she's the priority - it's her time to take care of herself and to find out who she is. "Holding onto emotions is like holding onto weight," he explains. "Let it go."

Over at Comeback Canyon, it's time for Jackie and Gina to weigh in. Bob has been working with the two moms all week on putting themselves first and focusing on their needs, and not just the needs of their families. Gina is five pounds away from "One"derland, and hasn't weighed less than 200 pounds since high school. Jackie's husband has never seen her under 250, and at 252, she's ready to reach that milestone. Jackie steps on the scale and loses three pounds, reaching her goal of weighing in the 240s. Gina is up next, and at 204 pounds, she needs to lose at least three pounds to stay in the game. Sadly, she only loses two, meaning she not only failed to reach "One"derland, she must also leave Comeback Canyon.

At the ranch weigh-in, the Red Team is up first, as they're the only team without penalties this week. Rob loses nine pounds, Jordan loses six, and Scott loses five. Blake is up next - she feels a lot of emotional weight has been lifted this week, and wonders whether that will translate on the scale. She steps on the scale and loses only three pounds, to 196, leaving her devastated and terrified of going home. The Red Team's total weight loss is 23 pounds, or 2.01%. The White Team is up next, and it's time to find out whether they were sinners or winners during their week in Vegas. They must lose more than 28 pounds to stay safe. Rondalee weighs in first and loses three pounds. JJ is up next, and everyone is concerned his partying will have taken its toll. But for the third week in a row, he drops a solid seven pounds. Toma loses eight and Woody is overjoyed to have lost seven. Overall, the team really stepped it up in Vegas, losing a total of 31 pounds, or 2.22%. It's the moment of truth for the Blue Team. Damien and Lori need to lose a collective 11 pounds, or they'll be down to a team of one. Lori loses only three and is heartbroken. It's once again up to Damien to pull through... and he does! Damien drops nine pounds, saving his team and bringing their total weight loss to 12 pounds, or 2.05%. But their joy is bittersweet, as this means that Blake has fallen below the Red Line and must leave the ranch. She's upset, but determined to keep working hard at home. Back at home, Gina weighs 172 lbs. and wants to do a triathlon by the finale.

Week 9: "Yes, Coach!"
First aired November 6, 2014
The contestants have officially reached the halfway point, and to celebrate, there are three special guests at the ranch to kick up the competition: Three-time Super Bowl champion Willie McGinest; all-time leading receiver for the Packers, Donald Driver; and NFL Hall of Famer, Michael "the Playmaker" Irvin. The NFL stars are not only going to participate in this week's challenge, they're also going to help coach the teams throughout the week.

This week, the contestants will compete in a football challenge with both their trainers and new coaches. This is Scott's worst nightmare - he's embarrassed that he's let himself go and is worried about the comments his former peers will make. For the competition, Donald Driver is paired with the White Team, Michael Irvin is sent to the Red Team, and Willie McGinest is reunited with his old teammate Damien on the Blue Team. Willie was Damien's mentor when he came up in the league, and Damien couldn't be happier to have his old friend by his side. The NFL stars will launch footballs at a trainer and contestant pair who are tied together. They must catch the ball, run it down the field, and throw it to another contestant in the end zone. The first team to get 10 footballs in the end zone grabs their sports drink, runs it down the field and drenches their coach. The winning team gets to video chat with their loved ones at home. Lori instantly gets emotional at the prospect of talking to her husband and son, and Jordan lights up at the idea of speaking with his pregnant wife. For the White Team, Sonya is catching with Jen and Woody is in the end zone. For the Red Team, Scott and Dolvett are catching, with Jordan in the end zone. For the Blue Team, Damien and Jessie are catching, while Lori is in the end zone. As soon as the competition begins, the Red and Blue Teams take off, while the White Team can't seem to catch one football. Sonya is a softball infielder and says she has no depth perception, and Jen keeps falling over. Finally they catch their first ball, but by that time the other two teams are nearly done. It's Scott vs. Damien, and in the end the Red Team is victorious! Scott realizes there was nothing to fear - the NFL stars are there to support him and the others. As Ali congratulates the Red Team on their victory and video chat prize, Rob announces that he'd like to give his video chat to Lori, who needs it more than he does. Lori is elated and incredibly grateful that she can now say happy birthday to her son.

During her session, Lori's husband and son tell her they are doing just fine without her and she can't come back yet. They don't want her to worry about them and they're not falling apart as Lori feared. Now that she can rest assured that her family is doing well, Lori feels she can focus on herself and the happy, positive person she's turning into. During his video chat, Scott gets to speak with his wife, son and daughter, all of whom burst into tears upon seeing how great he looks. The whole family sees this journey as a blessing and have an incredible attitude about everything. Jordan is beyond happy to see his wife, who was four and a half months pregnant when he left for the show, but is now only six weeks away from giving birth. She shows him an ultrasound and her burgeoning belly, and reminds Jordan how proud she is of him, and how he's doing this for the benefit of the family in the long run.

Back in the gym, the workouts with the legends have really motivated the contestants and trainers. After an inspiration workout, everyone huddles up and the pros give an epic pep talk. Later, Scott sits down with Michael, who can understand the ups and downs of playing and retiring from professional football. He gets a lot of insight from his fellow NFLer and feels like he's ready to let some of his pain go.

At Comeback Canyon, Bob is working with Blake and Jackie, both of whom are fierce competitors. "Because there's a red line at the ranch, usually the person coming into Comeback Canyon has an advantage," explains Bob. But this week, both women lost three pounds the week before, so they're pretty evenly matched. That said, Jackie is up first on the scale. She loses six pounds, or 2.41%, which means she now weighs 243 pounds. Blake is up next, and is worried because she has had a bunch of injuries and has been wearing two boots since Week 3. At 196 pounds, she needs to lose at least five pounds to beat Jackie. Unfortunately, she loses just one pound, or 0.51%. She's embarrassed, but Bob assures her there's nothing to be embarrassed about. She has grown up tremendously, opened up little by little and feels great now. When she first got to the ranch, she wanted to lose weight to make her parents proud, but she has since learned it needs to be about her. Although she's sad to see Blake leave, Jackie is incredibly proud of herself - she's the first contestant to win two weeks in a row at Comeback Canyon and is looking forward to defending her title.

At the ranch weigh-in, the White Team is up first. Rondalee steps on the scale and is thrilled to have lost seven pounds, breaking the 50-pound weight loss mark. JJ is up next and loses four pounds, while Toma loses eight. Woody is disappointed to have only lost three, but Sonya knocks it out of the park, losing a whopping nine pounds. The team's total weight loss is 31 pounds (2.27%). The Blue Team is up next, and needs to lose more than 12 pounds to stay safe. Lori drops six, so it's up to Damien to lose more than six pounds. But when he gets on the scale, he and everyone else are shocked to see he only dropped three pounds. That three does not reflect the work he did this week. The Blue Team's total is nine pounds (1.57%). The Red Team needs to lose more than 14 pounds to avoid the Red Line. Scott is up first and loses six pounds, followed by Jordan, who loses five. If Rob loses four pounds, he not only keeps the Red Team safe, but also hits the 100 pounds lost mark. He gets on the scale... and loses an incredible 13 pounds! He has now lost a total of 109 pounds since arriving at the ranch. The Red Team's total weight loss is 24 pounds (2.60%), which means the Blue Team lost the weigh-in and must face the Red Line. Sadly for Damien, despite posting big numbers week after week, the scale wasn't in his favor this time, and he is automatically eliminated. It will be interesting to see him take on the reigning champion Jackie at Comeback Canyon next week. When Blake started the Biggest Loser she weighed 251 lbs. She now weighs 161 lbs. and lost 90 lbs. She hopes to be in an adult soccer league and win the At-home prize.

Week 10: "Free Agents"
First aired November 13, 2014
To kick off the second half of the season, Ali announces it's time to re-pick the teams! At the beginning of the season, the contestants chose their teams, but this time the teams will be formed by chance. Each contestant will step up and select a kettlebell without seeing the color underneath. Whatever color they choose will determine the team they join. Sonya, having lost the highest percentage of weight, gets to choose first. She's completely freaked - she's been the biggest loser on the ranch for the past four weigh-ins, and Jen has been a huge part of her success. Sonya flips over her kettlebell... and she's now a member of the Red Team. One by one, everyone else chooses kettlebells and in the end, the new teams are:

Blue - Jordan, Woody, JJ
Red - Sonya, Rob, Toma
White - Rondalee, Scott, Lori

It's the first workout with the new teams, and some people are adjusting to the change better than others. Scott welcomes new beginnings, but Sonya is having a really hard time. Dolvett sits down and helps her work on seeing change as a positive thing. She has struggled with self-esteem her whole life, and while she did a lot of emotional work with Jen, with Dolvett she's focusing on being proud of the way she looks.

Now it's time for this week's challenge, with special guest Chef Rocco DiSpirito, who is here to help them learn to cook healthy. Each team will prepare a meal for Rocco, and the team with the best dish gets a one-pound advantage at the weigh-in. Rocco will be looking for taste, creativity and naturally, healthfulness. The Blue Team decides to make an egg white frittata and a healthy spin on French toast. The White Team makes an egg white omelet with asparagus and salmon, topped with homemade salsa and avocado, as well as French toast. The Red Team creates a turkey burger with egg on top, sweet potato chips and fruit. Rocco and Ali taste all the dishes, and Rocco is very impressed. In terms of flavor, the Red Team stood out, but not in a good way. Their turkey burger had way too much jalapeño and was basically inedible. It was neck and neck between Blue and White, and solely based on the nutritional value, the winner of a one-pound advantage is... the White Team! The other teams are concerned with the White Team's win; since they are the lightest team at the ranch, one pound can go a long way.

Meanwhile, over at Comeback Canyon, former teammates Damien and Jackie are now going head-to-head. Bob believes if anyone can beat NFLer Damien, it's the Queen of Comeback Canyon. Jackie steps on the scale first with a previous weight of 243 pounds. Her current weight is 239, meaning she lost four pounds, or 1.65%. She's happy to have finally made it into the 230s. Damien is up next, with a previous weight of 314. He needs to lose at least six pounds to dethrone Jackie, and loses an impressive eight, or 2.55%. He is psyched to be so close to the 200s, and to stay at Comeback Canyon another week. Jackie is happy to go home a different, stronger, happier person who can't wait to teach her kids a healthier lifestyle.

At the ranch weigh-in, everyone is nervous to see how the new teams will shake out. The White Team is up first and starts off with their one-pound advantage. Scott steps on the scale and loses nine pounds to 268 pounds. Lori drops four pounds to 245 pounds. Rondalee is hoping to get below 218 pounds, her plateau weight since high school. Unfortunately, she only loses three pound to 221, which Jen thinks has to do with the fact that she still hasn't gotten to the bottom of why Rondalee doesn't value herself. The White Team's total weight loss is 17 pounds, 2.27%. The Red Team needs to lose more than 18 pounds to stay safe from the Red Line. Sonya is up first and at 206 pounds, is shooting for Wonderland - she hasn't been in the 100s since she was in high school. She loses six pounds to 200, narrowly missing her goal. Rob is up next and loses eight pounds to 366, followed by Toma, who loses nine pounds to 246. In total, the Red Team loses 23 pounds, or 2.75%, meaning they are safe for the week. Last but not least is the Blue Team, which needs to drop 20 pounds. JJ steps up and loses eight, landing him at 309 pounds. Jordan is up next and loses a mere two pounds to 246, meaning the pressure is on Woody. He needs to lose 11 pounds to save Jordan, and after a few bad weigh-ins, he personally needs a win. Woody steps on the scale... and loses an incredible 15 pounds! The team's total is 25 pounds, 2.79%. This means that Rondalee has fallen below the Red Line, and must leave the ranch. Jackie now weighs 208 lbs. and wants to create a health and wellness program at her Native American community.

Week 11: "No 'I' In Team"
First aired November 20, 2014
Just when the new teams were settling in, they're dissolved for the week. The contestants are all on one team - and they have a mission. If all eight remaining contestants can lose a combined total of 50 pounds, everyone is safe for the week. But if they don't, there will be a yellow line and it'll be up to the rest of the players to vote someone out.

Now comes the challenge. The players have one hour to take sandbags from a giant pile and create a new pile of sandbags high enough to reach a set of planks. There are ten planks hanging overhead, the highest of which is 14 feet off the ground. For every plank the contestants knock off, they reduce the amount of weight the group has to lose by one pound. If they get all the planks, the players only have to lose 40 pounds this week in order to avoid the vote. It's over 100 degrees out, but the players aren't letting the heat stop them. They establish a sandbag perimeter and then start piling up a sand hill in the middle. Scott is the designated jumper and right off the bat knocks off two pounds. Then three. Then another two. With 20 minutes remaining, the players have three planks left. Everyone is sitting on the sandbags to hold them down while Scott jumps. He knocks another plank, as well as Toma's head, and with five minutes left, manages to knock down the last two planks in the nick of time! Now the eight contestants must lose an average of five pounds each in order to stay safe this week.

In the gym, everyone works hard and works together, although Dolvett is worried about Rob, who seems distracted. Rob explains that when he first got to the ranch, his self-hate was his fuel, what got him jacked up to work out. With 120 pounds left to lose, Dolvett explains that he has to stop making pain his friend. "It's a lot easier to find pain than love," Dolvett adds. Meanwhile, Jessie has his eye on Woody. He lost 15 pounds last week, which could make this week very tough for him. This week also marks the one-year anniversary of his wife's death, and Woody is emotional. He made a promise to her that he'd get healthy and that promise has been driving him through this process. His word is his bond and he has to do this.

Over at Comeback Canyon, newcomer Rondalee is preparing to take on reigning champion Damien. She currently weighs 221 pounds and would love to get below 218, her plateau weight. Bob's plan is to ignite her fire and teach her to love herself for who she is. She lost three pounds last week, so she's primed for a big weight loss this week. Always a competitor, the former volleyball star says, "To be the best, you have to beat the best." And she knows Damien is the best. At the weigh-in, Rondalee meets her goal, dropping four pounds to 217. She's elated, as it's been eight years since she weighed less than 218 pounds. Damien, who currently weighs 306, now needs to lose at least six pounds to win. He steps on the scale and drops a whopping 11 pounds, landing him at 295! Damien couldn't be happier - he hasn't weighed less than 300 pounds since middle school. With his 3.59% weight loss, Damien becomes the second person to win Comeback Canyon two weeks in a row.

Back at the ranch, it's time to see whether the all-for-one team can hit its 40-pound goal. If not, the two players with the lowest weight loss percentage fall below the yellow line, and the remaining players must choose one of them to go home. Sonya is up first and is hopeful that she'll finally get to Wonderland, where she hasn't been since high school. She steps on the scale and loses three pounds to 197, but is reluctant to celebrate reaching her goal, as she posted such a low number. Jordan is up next and drops four pounds to 242. Dolvett is disappointed in him and thinks he could have done better. JJ steps up next and only loses three pounds. Now everyone is getting worried - they're only at ten pounds and have 30 left to lose to keep everyone safe. That means the next five players must lose an average of six pounds a piece. But it's not looking good. Woody and Lori each lose only two pounds, followed by Rob who loses just one pound. Toma is up next and shocks the room... he GAINED one pound! Disappointed in himself, Toma explains there are still things inside of him that he needs to work out. Dolvett admits he didn't realize Toma was struggling, since he always says he's fine. Scott now has to pull off the biggest Hail Mary pass of all time. He needs to lose 26 pounds to save the whole team from elimination, which is nearly impossible. If he loses at least one pound, he pushes Rob below the yellow line and saves himself. Scott steps on the scale… and loses ZERO pounds! Everyone is completely shocked, and now they must choose between sending Scott or Toma home. It's a terrible decision, as Scott has been a leader and motivator all season long, while Toma has been working hard, but still has a lot of work left to do. During a tearful vote, Jordan and Rob vote to send Toma home, as Scott has been their friend and teammate at the ranch. JJ, Woody, and Lori vote to send Scott home, as they feel he is the most capable of succeeding at home. Despite his devastation, Scott has no hard feelings towards his fellow contestants and truly feels he has found himself throughout this process. He is happy to go home if it means Toma can continue his journey. But it's not over yet for Scott, as he competes against Damien, the two-time super bowl champion. Rondalee now weighs 189 lbs. and is very happy to be in "one-der land". She helps assists volleyball at her local high school and wants to do a triathlon after the finale.

Week 12: "The Playoffs"
First aired December 11, 2014
Coming off last week's devastating weigh-in, the final seven contestants are happy to still be here - and determined to make it to the end. Alison congratulates them all on making it to Week 12 and announces they have reached a new phase of the game: The Playoffs. If they want to take the title, they'll have to do it on their own, because we're officially going to singles! Everyone is assigned his or her own color: Lori is Team Gold for her three gold medals; JJ is Team Maroon; Woody is Aqua; Toma is Orange; Jordan is Grey; Sonya is Purple; and Rob is Team Green. The contestants are now free to workout with any of the trainers, but must face a Yellow Line this week.

At the first singles workout, the trainers push the players hard - they have a lot of catching up to do after their dismal performance on the scale last week. Toma is really upset about his +1 and knows if he falls below the Yellow Line, the others won't hesitate to vote him out. Rob is worried that with Scott gone, the former Team White members have a voting block of five, which gives them all the power. He knows it's paramount that he stay above the yellow line because old alliances don't die. Jessie realizes Rob's biggest issue is trust and encourages Rob to not let the games that go on at the ranch get in the way of the bigger picture. "For you, showing up here is do or die," he says, adding that the other contestants have reached weights where they could go home and be okay. "One hundred percent. I was 500 pounds." Rob responds. "I was dead before I was 30."

This week's challenge is a track and field event, Biggest Loser style. The contestants must jump over hurdles, wade through mud pits and memorize a pattern of colors. Then they return to the beginning and put colored pins in 16 squares to represent the pattern; they press a button that tells them whether they're right or wrong. If they're wrong, they must repeat the track and field course to check the color pattern. The first player to correctly recreate the pattern wins immunity! Lori is worried - she has a stress fracture on her foot and is medically cleared to compete, but she can only walk, not run. She figures this competition is a wash, and she'll never win. Toma is off to an early lead until Jordan passes him. Toma, Jordan and Woody are the first to get back to their color palettes to attempt to match the colors. Everyone gets it wrong on their first pass, which inspires JJ to adopt the strategy of going piece by piece and getting the pattern right, rather than attempting to fill the whole board at once. After going back and forth several times, Lori thinks she has it right but is afraid to press the button and have to return through the mud pits before she can guess again. She finally hits it - and wins! Lori now has immunity for the week.

Later on, the trainers have a surprise for everyone. To help push past last week, they reached out to the players' "home teams" to create video messages for their loved ones at the ranch. Rob gets a message from the rugby team he used to coach. Sonya gets messages from her elementary school PE class and Lori's old Olympic coach and teammate reach out to her with kind words. Woody, Jordan and JJ get messages from their old teammates. Toma gets a very special message from Frank Klopas, a former Chicago Fire pro soccer player whom Toma and his late father used to watch play. It reminds Toma of the good times he shared with his father and brings tears to his eyes. After Toma's emotional reaction and weight gain last week, Dolvett decides to take him off the ranch to a soccer field. The former soccer player comes alive, scoring goal after goal on Dolvett and reminiscing about his childhood and his father.

Over at Bob's house, it's time for the Comeback Canyon Super Bowl! Two NFL athletes, Scott and Damien, are set to go head-to-head and Bob couldn't be happier. He runs them through the NFL combine and is immensely proud at how far they've come since day one. When it comes to the weigh-in, it's going to be a tough fight. Damien has won two weigh-ins in a row - could tonight make it three? It'll be difficult considering Scott has the advantage of losing zero pounds last week. Scott steps on the scale first and loses nine pounds, 3.36%. Damien needs 10 pounds to keep his comeback alive, but only loses two, 0.68%. Bob is sad to see him go, but is proud of Damien for losing 95 pounds.

At the Ranch weigh-in, the contestants are eager to break out of last week's rut. Lori, who has immunity as long as she didn't gain weight, is up first and drops three pounds to 240. Woody is up next and loses nine. At 306 pounds, JJ is hoping to drop under 300, which he hasn't done since junior year of high school. He's ready to say goodbye to the 3s forever and he comes close - he loses six to reach 300 pounds exactly - and isn't happy. Sonya now needs to lose more than five pounds to stay safe, but knocks it out of the park by losing eight. Jordan drops nine pounds, followed by Toma, who loses a whopping 11 pounds! He is relieved and completely overjoyed to have officially lost 101 pounds. Toma's triumph, however, puts JJ in jeopardy. Rob is up last and either he or Woody will join JJ below the Yellow Line. He needs to lose ten pounds to stay safe... and loses an incredible 15! This brings Rob's total weight loss this season to 150 pounds, an incredible feat. Unfortunately, that means best friends Woody and JJ have fallen below the Yellow Line and the others must vote one of them off the Ranch. Toma chooses JJ, as he has a better support system at home. Jordan agrees and also picks JJ. Sonya makes her decision based on if there had been a Red Line, who would have gone home. That means that JJ, with three votes, is sent home. But wait - Ali has an announcement! "This season you have done everything you can to rediscover the athlete inside of you," she says. "But now it's time to put it to the test in one of the most challenging physical environments on Earth. You're all about to experience Hawaii... Biggest Loser style." Damien now weighs 281 lbs. and wants to get active with his family. He plans to run a 5k and wants to educate former football athletes on how to stay healthy.

Week 13: "Kauai, Part 1"
First aired December 18, 2014
Welcome to Hawaii! The players will be competing for two weeks in Kauai, taking advantage of all the island has to offer. The contestants work out on the beach, taking advantages of the water, sand and rocks all around them. Sonya feels great - she's smaller than she was at the height of her softball career and realizes her glory days are now. For some of the contestants, however, it's surreal to be back in a place they've visited while at their heaviest. They missed out on a lot of the opportunities Hawaii has to offer the first time and refuse to repeat the past. Dolvett is concerned about Rob, whom he thinks isn't showing up in full force. Rob isn't feeling well - he's dizzy and blacking out and doesn't want to be here.

For the first challenge in Hawaii, the players must kayak 1,000 feet out into the ocean to a buoy, where they pick up puzzle pieces and bring them back to shore to complete a puzzle. The winner gets a prize, which will be revealed in the puzzle. Woody is terrified - he hates deep water and has never been on a boat. Lori is the first one in her kayak, while Woody is in last place, terrified of tipping over. Jordan and Lori quickly take the lead, and while Lori easily unclips her puzzle pieces, Jordan can't seem to unhook them. Toma and Sonya flip their canoes and end up in the water, while Rob finally gets his puzzle pieces, only to flip over. Lori's the first one back, with Jordan right behind her. It's a close one, but Jordan solves the puzzle first and wins a helicopter ride around the island. He chooses Toma to join him, and the two men are ecstatic to experience Kauai from a whole new vantage point.

Back in Los Angeles, Bob once again has two football players, J.J. and Scott, to work with at Comeback Canyon. Scott is feeling fantastic and can't wait to get back to the ranch. After a difficult hike, Bob shows the men photos of themselves when they first came to the ranch. Scott thinks he looks like his dad and admits he had given up, while Bob tells J.J. he doesn't even recognize him. At the Comeback Canyon weigh-in, it's time to see which football player will stay another week. J.J. is up first, and is hoping to drop eight pounds to reach 100 pounds lost. His starting weight is 300, and he loses exactly eight pounds to reach 292! He's ecstatic to not only reach his goal, but also to get under 300 pounds. He marvels at how different he feels physically and emotionally 100 pounds later. Now Scott, at 259 pounds, needs to lose at least seven pounds to stay in the game. He steps on the scale and drops eight pounds to 251! J.J. is going home, but he has no regrets. He's so proud of how far he's come and feels he's leaving a better person.

Meanwhile, in Hawaii, Jen takes Woody and Sonya on a snorkeling trip. She's encouraged them to overcome their fears all season, and now she wants them to help her push past her fear of water. The three White Team members have a beautiful time and Woody and Sonya thank their trainer for saving their lives and helping them get to this point. As the contestants paddle into their first Hawaiian weigh-in, they are all nervous about the Red Line, seeing as travel often complicates weight loss. Sonya is up first and is six pounds away from losing 100 pounds, a feat she never thought was possible. She steps on the scale at 189 pounds and is overjoyed to lose exactly six pounds to weigh 183 pounds. Lori is up next and drops 10 pounds to weigh 230. This is the first time she's lost double digits, and she couldn't be happier. Up next is Toma, who needs to lose more than seven pounds to avoid the Red Line. He, too, drops 10 pounds, to 225. Next on the scale is Rob, who is incredibly scared, considering how poorly he handles change. He needs to lose more than 11 pounds to stay safe, and he loses 12! Jordan is next on the scale and loses just six pounds to reach 227, landing his name right above the Red Line. The last contestant to weigh in is Woody, who hopes to either lose six pounds to weigh under 300, or eight pounds, to reach 100 pounds lost. Woody handily beats his goal by losing 12 pounds to weigh 294! He knows his wife is looking down on him, and he couldn't be more thankful for the Biggest Loser experience. Sadly, this means it's time for Jordan to leave paradise. Back at home, JJ is at 261 lbs. and finally wanted to fulfill the promise to his younger brother and his younger brother wants to be a football player like JJ. He plans to coach his brother's football team and winning the At-home prize.

Week 14: "Kauai, Part 2"
First aired January 1, 2015
It's a new year, and the contestants are reaching the end of their life-changing journey. The trainers want to make sure the players have started planning for their new lives. In accordance with their advice, the trainers put the contestants through a grueling workout using elements from the jungle around them. The players think about their new goals while lifting tree trunks and moving around palm fronds.

Later, Dolvett takes Rob aside for a special adventure: repelling off a waterfall. While Rob is initially reluctant, Dolvett encourages him to look his fear in the face and say, "I'm not going to let you hurt me anymore." Dolvett is afraid of heights, so this challenge will enable the two of them to face their fears together. But it's not going to be an easy journey. At the practice wall, Rob is terrified and starts crying. After that, Rob doesn't want to do it anymore. Dolvett is well aware that Rob deals with fear in unhealthy ways and is saddened to see Rob break down and storm off. He knows Rob doesn't trust himself, his body or his abilities, and Dolvett is desperate to help him see that his inadequacies are all in his mind. But failure is not an option, and with Dolvett by his side, Rob successfully makes it down the waterfall and feels on top of the world.

Meanwhile, Jessie takes Lori for a similarly uplifting experience. He knows his former Blue Team member started off this journey held back by a lot of pain and suffering, which is why he has planned for her to swing from a rope high above the jungle floor. Despite her fears, Lori does let go of the rope and screams that she's letting go of the old Lori as she flies through the sky. As evidence of Lori's new lease on life, she and Sonya do something they used to dread: putting on bathing suits. The women celebrate all their hard work by enjoying themselves on the beach, feeling amazing and confident in their new bodies. For Lori, she finally feels like her old, beautiful self, but for Sonya, this is "uncharted waters." She has struggled with her weight her whole life and has never been able to put on a swimsuit without feeling ashamed of her body.

Now it's time for this week's challenge. Ali announces that the contestants will have to maneuver a coconut through an obstacle course with a lacrosse stick. The first player to score three goals wins the challenge, as well as a one-pound advantage on the scale. This is a huge prize, and the players know it; but the challenge is a difficult undertaking. Everyone struggles on the balance beam except for Toma, who is light on his toes from years of playing soccer. He runs circles around the other contestants, but he can't seem to score a goal to save his life. Lori has a hard time tossing her coconut over a limbo stick and catching it on the other side, but when she finally masters it, she's unstoppable. The Olympic pitcher scores three for three, winning the coveted pound advantage.

Meanwhile, at Comeback Canyon, Bob works with Scott and Jordan to determine their New Year's goals. Scott's is to return to the ranch, while Jordan's is to be the Biggest Loser. Bob then puts the men through a balance exercise, which is a metaphor for finding balance upon returning home. Scott and Jordan must climb up to a balance beam 25 feet in the air, walk across it and then jump off together. Scott is so scared, his legs start shaking, but both guys push through and complete the task.

At the weigh-in, Jordan is four pounds away from losing 100 pounds, while Scott is looking to win three Comeback Canyon weigh-ins in a row. Jordan steps on the scale first and loses an impressive eight pounds to weigh 219. He has hit his goal and officially lost 104 pounds since arriving at the ranch! At 251 pounds, Scott needs to lose at least nine pounds to keep his comeback alive. And he does it exactly! He finally feels like things he thought were impossible are now possible. Despite losing the weigh-in, Jordan is excited to go home, see the birth of his son and start his new, healthy life with his family.

Back at the ranch, the contestants have returned for their 14th weigh-in to see who will take on Scott at Comeback Canyon. With the Red Line in play this week, everyone is nervous to fall below it and be sent home. The weigh-in begins with Lori, who is worried that she won't be able to pull a big number two weeks in a row. Her fears are confirmed when she loses a mere three pounds to reach 227, which, added to her one-pound advantage, puts her at 1.74% weight loss and at risk of falling below the Red Line. Toma is up next and, at 225 pounds, needs to lose more than three pounds to stay in the game. He loses eight and is safe. Sonya also needs to lose more than three pounds and loses a solid five to weigh 178 pounds. As the biggest guy on the ranch, Rob must lose more than five pounds to stay safe, and he manages to lose six to weigh 332 pounds. Woody is up last and needs to lose more than five pounds to avoid the Red Line. Sadly, he loses only three to weigh 291, but he has an incredible attitude about the whole experience. Jen agrees and adds that he has reinvented the man that he is. Woody is now confident that he's prepared to take on the real world after losing 107 pounds throughout his time at the ranch, but not ready to go home when he faces against Scott at Comeback Canyon. Jordan returns home weighing in at 195 lbs. He makes back in time for his son's birth who is named Sawyer Michael Alicandro. Before he came onto the show, he wants his son to look up to him, the new, healthier person. Jordan is now training for a half marathon and plans on joining a softball league in the spring.

Week 15: "Makeover Week"
First aired January 8, 2015

After 15 grueling weeks, the former athletes have made it to Makeover Week, and they couldn't be more excited! At a meeting with Tim Gunn to get their new looks and wardrobes, Sonya, Rob, Lori and Toma learn they will also be doing a photo shoot for Us Weekly magazine. Tim can't wait to get the contestants into real clothes and let them see how fabulous they are. Sonya is up first, and when she comes out in a green dress, she is speechless. Looking in the mirror, she envisions all the things she never thought she could do because she hated the way she looked. When Lori walks out in a curve-hugging red dress, Tim is completely floored, as is Lori! She starts to cry, saying it's the first time in a long time she's put on clothes that make her feel beautiful. The athletes then head to the Ken Paves salon to get new haircuts to match their new looks.

Now it's time to show off all their hard work to the trainers, Ali and Tim Gunn. On a beautiful rooftop in Los Angeles, Lori steps out onto the red carpet and jaws literally drop. Jessie immediately runs over to hug her. Lori then goes to see the outcome of her Us Weekly photo shoot. First she sees the photo of herself when she first started on the Biggest Loser. Then she sees the beautiful photo of herself from the shoot. And then, instead of a third photo coming up, her husband and son walk out. They are stunned at how gorgeous she looks and are so proud of her. Next up is clean-shaven Toma, who stuns in a blazer and bow tie. Toma is pleased with his hard work as well and knows his father would be proud of what he's accomplished. After Toma looks at his photos, his mother and sister greet him with tears in their eyes. Rob then walks out and blows everyone away in a suit and tie. Seeing his old and new photos, Rob can really see the 150 pounds he lost for the first time. He's even more excited to get to celebrate with his brother, who is completely overwhelmed at his brother's transformation. When Sonya steps out, everyone is amazed - they're seeing a whole new woman. Now it's time to get the party started! The trainers, Ali, Tim, the contestants and their family and friends all toast to the former athletes' incredible journey and new beginnings. As a special surprise, Gavin DeGraw comes out and performs his new single, "Fire," and everyone enjoys a rooftop celebration.

Over at Comeback Canyon, it's the most important week yet. The winner of this week's weigh-in gets to return to the ranch with Bob as his Comeback player. Both Woody and Scott want it bad and it's going to be one hell of a fight. But first, the two men need to have their own makeovers! Scott and Woody get the royal treatment from Tim Gunn and Ken Paves, and Bob can't wait to see what they look like.
Scott steps out first in a three-piece suit and Bob is floored. That's when his wife and children walk out, and the whole family starts crying and hugging. Woody walks out next, and Bob is impressed by his transformation, as is Woody. His children come out and can't hold back the tears. They are so proud of their father and happy that he kept his promise to their mother.

But just because it's Makeover Week doesn't mean there isn't a weigh-in! Scott and Woody psych themselves up in their Last-Chance Workout, ready to take their spot back on the ranch. Woody is ready to be the one who finally takes down the undefeated Scott. While they trade barbs at the gym, it's all talk until they step on the Comeback Canyon scale for the final time. Woody is up first. When he first came on the show, he weighed 398 pounds. His previous weight was 291. And his current weight is... 285! Woody loses a solid six pounds, but is it enough to beat Scott? Fifteen weeks ago, Scott weighed 366 pounds. His previous weight was 242 and he needs to lose at least five pounds to be Bob's Comeback Canyon player. His current weight is... well, looks like we'll have to wait till next week to find that out!

Meanwhile, armed with their new 'dos, the final four are ready for their weigh-in to see who will be the final three. It's been a tough week, as the players haven't had as much time to work out. To make things more stressful, the yellow line is back in play. Rob is up first and loses only two pounds to 330. He's devastated and can't explain his low number. Toma is up next and drops just one pound to 216, which frustrates him greatly. Sonya then steps on the scale and loses three pounds to 175. While it's a low number, it's enough to keep her in the game. Lori gets on the scale and needs to lose more than one pound to stay safe. Unfortunately, she loses only one pound to 226, putting her below the yellow line with Toma. But before there can be a vote, Tim Gunn pops up on the screen with another surprise. There will be no yellow line this week! Everyone is safe and no one is going home! But just when they think they've seen everything, the gym doors open and Bob Harper walks in... Who is his Comeback Canyon player? And how will the final four react to facing an eliminator competitor?

Week 16: "The Comeback"
First aired January 15, 2015

Bob Harper bursts into the gym and he's not alone - Woody is back on the ranch! Bob reveals this season's biggest twist: Comeback Canyon and how Woody took down Scott, the beast who won three weigh-ins in a row. It was revealed the Scott only lost two pounds, so Scott was sent home last week.

But the reaction from the remaining contestants isn't all positive. Rob, for one, is super pissed. He said that he thought that he was in the top 3, the top 4, and now in the top 5. After the contestants left the gym, Dolvett goes to Rob's room and tells him that when he's been since he started that the show can throw a curveball. He tells him to win his life and to stop letting anger control him. This is a whole new way of processing life for Rob, and he still has a long way to go to find balance. At home, Scott now weighs 240 lbs. He plans to keep track of his miles, taking his family ice-skating, and going back to the University of Utah. He is coaching his daughter's basketball team and is working on a book about his journey on the Biggest Loser.

For this week's competition, each player has to row 2,000 meters on the rowing machine, unlocking a rack of medicine balls, which they must use to shoot free throws. The first person to get five balls in the hoop gets a one-pound advantage on the scale. Now that they're in the top five, every pound counts and all the contestants know this. Toma is the first off the rower, with Woody right behind him and Rob finishing third. Rob goes for the granny shot, putting the first point on the board. Lori is shooting now, while Sonya is still rowing. Soon Toma, Rob and Lori are neck and neck at four points apiece, and it's all down to one shot. It's a photo finish between Toma and Rob - each thinks he's won, but they have to go to the tape. The winner of a one-pound advantage is Toma! It's the first individual challenge he's won, and he couldn't be happier.

Back at the ranch, Sonya has an emotional talk with Jen. She's turning 40 on weigh-in day and is worried about heading back to the real world. There are a lot of things she thought she would have accomplished by age 40, such as being a wife and mother, and it's weighing heavy on her heart. Jen reassures her that for 16 weeks they've been finding a new pattern for her, and while it won't be perfect, she needs to make a decision at home to continue to have the same mentality she's had at the ranch. Sonya realizes there is no deadline, no finish, and she has to take things one day at a time.

And now for the weigh-in! For the first time this season, Bob Harper and his Comeback contestant are participating in the ranch weigh-in. To make things more difficult, the contestants are facing the Red Line. Toma is up first, and drops a whopping 14 pounds to 202! With his one-pound advantage, Toma has a total weight loss of 6.94%, making it his best week of the entire season. Lori is up next, and she loses six pounds to weigh 220. She's very pleased. The last time she weighed that amount was when she retired from the Olympics and met her husband. Sonya then steps on the scale, and needs to lose more than four pounds to secure her spot in the final four. She celebrates her 40th birthday by losing six pounds, taking her to 169 and making her total weight loss 40% of her body weight! Next up is Rob, to make sure he's safe, he needs to lose more than 8 lbs., and loses an incredible 15 pounds! The now 315-pound member of the final four gets emotional just thinking about how far he's come. Now it all comes down to Woody. Either he or Lori will earn a spot in the final four, while the other will be eliminated tonight. In order to be safe, he needs to lose more than 7 lbs. The Comeback contestant steps up to the scale and loses 11 pounds to 274, officially knocking Lori out of the competition. Lori now weighs 210 lbs. and enjoys going to amusement parks with her family and coach her softball team. She wants to run a 5k and to take home the gold by winning the at-home prize.

Week 17: "End Zone"
First aired January 22, 2015

It's down to the final four - Rob, Sonya, Woody and Toma - and after 17 weeks, someone's dream of becoming a finalist comes to an end.

The contestants walk into the gym to see Jenna Wolfe, a lifestyle and fitness correspondent for the Today Show. Despite being seven months pregnant, Jenna shows the players how to work out without a gym. At the same time, Bob Harper gives the other trainers a workout of a lifetime.

For this week's competition, the contestants return to the Coliseum, where their Biggest Loser journey began. Alison Sweeney announces they have to put the weight back on - literally. Every single pound they lost this season will be strapped to their bodies. They will race around the Coliseum to various checkpoints representing each weigh-in, where they will drop the amount of weight they lost that week. Whoever finishes first wins a one-pound advantage on the scale, as well as $5,000.

Sonya is carrying 114 pounds, Woody has 124 pounds, Toma has 134, and Rob has 168 pounds to carry. The players flash back to what it felt like to be at their original weights, making this challenge an emotional and physical undertaking. While Rob and Woody fall behind, Sonya and Toma are neck and neck, racing towards the win. In the end, Toma crosses the finish line first.

That night, the trainers sit down with each contestant to go through a highlight tape of their Biggest Loser journey. There isn't a dry eye in the house when the players look back at their former selves - how miserable and uncomfortable they were and how little they enjoyed life. After seeing their videos, the contestants are grateful for their trainers and the hard work they've put in to change their lives.

And now for the final ranch weigh-in. Toma, weighing in at 202, is up first. He loses three pounds to 199. He's finally below 200, though he's upset that he couldn't put up a bigger number. Adding in his one-pound advantage, Toma's percentage of weight lost is 1.98%. Rob, who currently weighs 315 pounds, steps up next. He needs to have lost more than six pounds to secure his spot in the finals. And he loses 13 pounds! The now 302-pound contestant tears up with joy, expressing how appreciative he is for the opportunity to be here. With a 4.13% weight loss, Rob is officially a Biggest Loser finalist. Woody is the next to weigh in, and at 274 pounds, he must lose more than five pounds to stay on the ranch. He drops four to 270 pounds, and while he's not guaranteed a spot in the finals, he's incredibly proud of himself and knows his wife is proud of him as well. Woody's 1.46% weight loss does, however, mean Toma is officially a finalist. Now it's up to Sonya to see whether she or Woody will make it to the end. At 169 pounds, Sonya is terrified her body will decide it's done losing weight. She's been the Biggest Loser on the ranch for 11 weeks in a row and needs to lose more than two pounds. Sonya steps on the scale and drops six pounds! With 3.55% weight loss, Sonya is officially a finalist!
Sadly, Woody has fallen below the Red Line and is eliminated. But he's positive he has the tools he needs to go home and change his life. Rob, Sonya and Toma are the three finalists competing for the title of The Biggest Loser. 

Back to home, Woody is at 250 lbs. and enjoys working out with his family. His dream is to coach football and complete 5k runs to raise awareness for breast cancer.

Week 18: "Finale"
First aired January 29, 2015

After months of workouts at the ranch, as well as at-home training once the show ended, it was time to see if this season's contestants have reclaimed their glory days. There also was another prize at stake tonight: $100K for the At-Home Winner. Jordan had won the At-home prize with a percentage of weight-loss of 44.27%. Scott, Damien, and Woody were the only contestants who gained some weight after leaving the ranch.

Sonya, Toma and Rob then weighed in for the $250K prize, as well as the title of the Biggest Loser. Sonya weighed in first; she lost 144 pounds (50.88%) and landed at 139. Rob was next, and needed to lose more than 245 to take the lead, but he fell short by losing 238, his current weight was 245. Eventually Toma won the Biggest Loser, beating Sonya by one pound (or by 1/100th of a percent, the closest percentage between the winner and runner-up in any season)

Reception

U.S. Nielsen ratings

See also
The Biggest Loser (U.S. TV series)
The Biggest Loser

References

External links
Official website

The Biggest Loser
2014 American television seasons
2015 American television seasons